Kenneth Samuel Lockhart (23 May 1913 – 21 February 2006) was an Australian rules footballer who played with Footscray in the Victorian Football League (VFL).

Notes

External links 

1913 births
2006 deaths
Australian rules footballers from Victoria (Australia)
Western Bulldogs players